Glyphodes convolvulalis is a moth in the family Crambidae. It was described by Sepp in 1848. It is found in Suriname.

References

Moths described in 1848
Glyphodes